Taha Akgül (born November 22, 1990 in Sivas, Turkey) is an Olympic, World and European champion Turkish freestyle wrestler competing in the 125 kg division. He is a graduate of the Karamanoğlu Mehmetbey University Physical Education and Sports Academy and completed his master's degree at Sivas Cumhuriyet University.

Wrestling career
Akgül took up wrestling in 2003 following his father and brother. He won the gold medal at the 40th Yaşar Doğu International Wrestling Tournament held in 2012. At the 2012 European Wrestling Championships held in Belgrade, Serbia, Taha Akgül became champion in his weight category. He is now considered the best active wrestler with Abdulrashid Sadulaev.

He qualified for the 2012 Olympics. He did not advance to quarterfinal after losing to Bilyal Makhov from Russia in the round of 16. At the 2012 World University Wrestling Championships held in Kuortane, Finland, he became gold medallist in his weight class.

Taha Akgül defended his European champion title at the 2013 European Wrestling Championships held in Tbilisi, Georgia. He won the bronze medal at the 2013 World Wrestling Championships in Budapest, Hungary.

In 2014 and 2015 he won the world title in the 125 kg division. In 2014 he named as the Best Wrestler of the Year by the Turkish Wrestling Federation. He won a gold medal at the 2016 Olympics, defeating Komeil Ghasemi in the final.

Taha Akgul won the gold medal at the 2017 European Wrestling Championships in Serbia on Friday.

World Championships 2017, Paris: It was a dramatic gold medal match. Akgul scored the first point on the counter in less than one minute into the game. The Turkish international continued to dominate the first period by taking a four-point lead. But the Georgian wrestler turned the tables in his favour in the dying seconds of the first half. Within one minute he covered the four-point lead by two successive takedowns, levelling the score at 4-4.
In the second half, both the wrestlers went into attacking mode. With a series of attacks, the wrestlers were drawn at 8-8. But in the final 10 seconds of the bout, Petriashvili executed a two-pointer move and became the world champion.

Taha Akgul won gold medals on Sunday at the European Wrestling Championships held in Kaspiysk in Russia's northern Caucasus Republic of Dagestan. He won against Georgian wrestler Geno Petriashvili 2-1 to become the European champion in the 125-kilogram category.

Taha Akgul comes second in World Wrestling C'ships. Akgul wins silver medal in World Wrestling Championships, losing to Georgia's Petriashvili in men's freestyle final.

Taha Akgül on April 22 won gold in the 2021 European Championships in Warsaw. Akgül secured his eighth European title as the 30-year-old beat his Russian opponent Sergei Kozyrev via disqualification (9-2) in the men's freestyle 125-kilogram final. He had previously won gold in the 2016 Rio de Janeiro Olympic Games. Speaking to Anadolu Agency (AA) about his latest success, Akgül said winning the tournament after being forced to a nearly two-year hiatus due to injury was a great morale boost for him. “I won my 8th European title after defeating my rivals with overwhelming superiority. It was really important for me to win a gold medal, considering I joined straight to European Championships after my 1.5-year break. And the Olympics is so close,” Akgül said, adding that he would be aiming for a second Olympic gold medal at Tokyo 2020.

In 2022, he won the gold medal in his event at the Yasar Dogu Tournament held in Istanbul, Turkey. He  won the gold medal in the men's 125 kg event at the 2022 European Wrestling Championships held in Budapest, Hungary. Akgül claimed a 5–2 victory over Geno Petriashvili from Georgia in the 125 kg freestyle division in Hungary's capital. Taha Akgul won his ninth gold medal in the 125 kg freestyle division. He won the gold medal in the men's 125kg event at the 2022 World Wrestling Championships held in Belgrade, Serbia. United World Wrestling has announced Taha Akgul as the 2022 Freestyle Wrestler of the Year after his three title-winning performances in 2022.

Major results

Wrestling record

See also
 Rıza Kayaalp

References

External links
 

1990 births
People from Sivas
Living people
Olympic wrestlers of Turkey
Wrestlers at the 2012 Summer Olympics
European Games medalists in wrestling
European Games gold medalists for Turkey
Wrestlers at the 2015 European Games
Turkish male sport wrestlers
World Wrestling Championships medalists
European champions for Turkey
Medalists at the 2016 Summer Olympics
Wrestlers at the 2016 Summer Olympics
Olympic gold medalists for Turkey
World Wrestling Champions
Universiade medalists in wrestling
Mediterranean Games gold medalists for Turkey
Mediterranean Games medalists in wrestling
Competitors at the 2013 Mediterranean Games
Universiade gold medalists for Turkey
European Wrestling Champions
Medalists at the 2013 Summer Universiade
Wrestlers at the 2020 Summer Olympics
Olympic medalists in wrestling
Medalists at the 2020 Summer Olympics
Olympic bronze medalists for Turkey